David Rodríguez Labault (born July 7, 1977) is a Latin Grammy winning Puerto Rican singer and songwriter who uses the stage name Siete (usually stylized as Sie7e).

Career

David Rodríguez Labault, known as Sie7e by his birth date, studied sound engineering in the United States, while collaborating with several music projects. After returning to Puerto Rico, he started working in advertising.

In 2005, he decided to dedicate himself to music, releasing his first eponymous album the following year. Beyond that, he has released two more albums, the last one being Mucha Cosa Buena, in 2011. Sie7e was first signed by Universal Music, but in 2011, he signed with Warner Music Latina.

Rodríguez has a wife, Jessica, and a son, Jai.

On November 10, 2011 he won the Latin Grammy for Best New Artist.

Discography

 Sie7e (2006)
 Para Mí (2008)
 Mucha Cosa Buena (2011)
 Relax (2014)
 Yo Tengo Tu Love (2011)
 Gaia (2020)

References

Living people
People from Bayamón, Puerto Rico
Puerto Rican guitarists
21st-century Puerto Rican male singers
Puerto Rican singer-songwriters
Latin Grammy Award for Best New Artist
1977 births
Latin music songwriters
American male singer-songwriters